Mike W. Barr (born May 30, 1952) is an American writer of comic books, mystery novels, and science fiction novels. Barr has written for every one of the first four incarnations of Star Trek: Star Trek, Star Trek: The Next Generation, Star Trek: Deep Space Nine and Star Trek: Voyager, in either comic book or other media.

Career

Comics
Barr's debut as a comics professional came in DC Comics' Detective Comics #444 (Dec. 1974–Jan. 1975), for which he wrote an eight-page back-up mystery feature starring the Elongated Man. Another Elongated Man story followed in Detective Comics #453 (Nov. 1975). He wrote text articles and editorial replies in letter columns for the next few years. By mid-1980 he was writing regularly for both DC and Marvel, including stories for Mystery in Space, Green Lantern, The Brave and the Bold, Marvel Team-Up, and a Spider-Man/Scarlet Witch team-up in Marvel Fanfare #6.

Legion of Super-Heroes #277 (July 1981) saw him take on editorial duties at DC, a position he would hold until 1987. In December 1982, he and artist Brian Bolland began Camelot 3000, a 12 issue limited series that was one of DC Comics' first direct market projects. Barr and artist Trevor Von Eeden produced the first Green Arrow limited series in 1983. When the long running The Brave and the Bold series came to its conclusion with issue #200 (July 1983), it featured a preview of a new Batman series, Batman and the Outsiders by Barr and artist Jim Aparo, which would be described by DC Comics writer and executive Paul Levitz as being "a team series more fashionable to 1980s audiences." The Masters of Disaster were among the supervillains created by Barr and Aparo for the series. Barr wrote every issue of the original series, and its Baxter paper spinoff, The Outsiders that did not include Batman and introduced Looker. After the series' cancellation in February 1988, it was revived in November 1993 by Barr and artist Paul Pelletier.

He was one of the contributors to the DC Challenge limited series in 1986 and wrote the "Batman: Year Two" storyline in Detective Comics #575–578 (June–Sept. 1987) which followed up on Frank Miller's "Batman: Year One". Barr introduced the Reaper in Detective Comics #575 (June 1987) and returned to the character in the Batman: Full Circle one-shot in 1991. Another project from 1987 was the Batman: Son of the Demon graphic novel which was drawn by Jerry Bingham, proceeds from which reputedly "restored DC Comics to first place in sales after fifteen years." This title, and Barr's work on Batman with artist Alan Davis have been cited by Grant Morrison as key inspirations for his own run on the Batman title. Barr's sequel, Batman: Bride of The Demon, was published in 1991. Barr's Batman stories and scripts have been adapted into several mediums, including for episodes of Batman: The Animated Series.

From 1989 to 1990, he took over DC's Doc Savage series from Dennis O'Neil, which saw the 1930s super-scientist taken to the present day. It was also notable as featuring Doc Savage's first-ever team-up with The Shadow, another popular hero of the pulp magazine era and inspiration for Batman. The two characters appeared together in a four-issue story, The Conflagration Man, that crossed back and forth between each character's DC comic book series.

In 2007, he wrote a two-part story for the pages of DC's JLA: Classified (#47–48, Jan–Feb 2008), returned to the Outsiders with Outsiders: Five of a Kind — Katana/Shazam #1 (Oct. 2007), contributed to Tokyopop's Star Trek: The Manga, and relaunched Maze Agency at IDW Publishing. He has scripted many of Bongo Comics' The Simpsons titles, including a Christmas story for 2010. His other comics work includes Mantra for Malibu Comics and Maze Agency for Comico Comics and Innovation Publishing.

Prose
In May 2010, the Invisible College Press published Barr's science fiction/fantasy novel, Majician/51, about the discoveries of a scientist working at Area 51.

Barr contributed to the Silver Age Sentinels short story anthologies from Guardians of Order.

Bibliography

Comico Comics
 Maze Agency #1–7 (1988–1989)

Dark Horse Comics
 Dark Horse Comics #14–15 (1993)
 Dark Horse Presents #117, 119, 135 (1997–1998)

DC Comics
 Action Comics #537–538 (1982)
 The Adventures of Superman Annual #9 (1997)
 The Adventures of the Outsiders #33–38 (1986)
 Arak, Son of Thunder #7–8 (1982)
 Batman #327, 329, 331, 334, 353, Annual #8–9, Special #1 (1980–1985)
 Batman and the Outsiders #1–32, Annual #1–2 (1983–1986)
 Batman: Bride of the Demon HC (1991)
 Batman: Dark Knight Dynasty HC (1998)
 Batman: Full Circle #1 (1991)
 Batman: Gotham Knights #25 (Batman Black and White) (2002)
 Batman: In Darkest Knight #1 (1994)
 Batman: Legends of the Dark Knight #21–23 (1991)
 Batman: Reign of Terror #1 (1999)
 Batman: Son of the Demon HC (1987)
 Batman: Two-Face Strikes Twice #1–2 (1993)
 Beware the Batman #5 (2014)
 The Brave and the Bold #169, 177, 184, 190, 192, 194–195, 198–200 (1980–1983)
 Bruce Wayne: The Road Home: Outsiders #1 (2010)
 Camelot 3000 #1–12 (1982–1985)
 DC Challenge #5 (1986)
 DC Comics Presents #22, 39, 42, 47, 58, 83 (1980–1985)
 DC Retroactive: Batman – The '80s #1 (2011)
 DC Special Blue Ribbon Digest #23 (1982)
 Detective Comics #444, 453, 488, 490–491, 500, 507, 569–581 (1974–1987)
 Detective Comics vol. 2 #27 (2014)
 Doc Savage #7–24, Annual #1 (1989–1990)
 Elvira's House of Mystery #7 (1986)
 The Flash #313 (1982)
 Green Arrow #1–4 (1983)
 Green Lantern #131, 154–165 (1980–1983)
 Heroes Against Hunger #1 (1986)
 House of Mystery #269, 279, 285, 288, 291, 320 (1979–1983)
 JLA: Classified #47–48 (2008)
 JSA: Classified #38–39 (2008)
 Justice League Adventures #8 (2002)
 Mystery in Space #111–112, 115–117 (1980–1981)
 The New Teen Titans #37 (1983)
 The Outsiders #1–28, Annual #1, Special #1 (1985–1988)
 The Outsiders vol. 2 #1–24, #0 (1993–1995)
 The Outsiders: Five of a Kind – Katana/Shazam #1
 Saga of the Swamp Thing #2–8 (Phantom Stranger backup stories) (1982)
 Secret Origins vol. 2 #6, 10, 44, 47 (1986–1990)
 Secrets of Haunted House #15, 28 (1979–1980)
 The Shadow Strikes #5–6 (1990)
 Showcase '93 #4–5 (1993)
 Star Trek #1–16, Annual #1–2, Movie Special #1–2 (1984–1987)
 Star Trek: Deep Space Nine/Star Trek: The Next Generation #1–2 (1994)
 Star Trek: The Next Generation Annual #4 (1993)
 Superman 80–Page Giant #1 (1999)
 Tales of the Green Lantern Corps #1–3 (1981)
 Time Warp #1, 3 (1980)
 The Unexpected #192, 196, 200, 205–213 (1979–1981)
 Weird War Tales #70, 84, 93, 99–100, 106–108 (1978–1982)
 World's Finest Comics #274–278, 282–284, 288, 300 (1981–1984)

First Comics
 E-Man vol. 2 #4 (1983)

IDW Publishing
 Maze Agency #1–2 (2005)

Innovation Publishing
 Maze Agency #8–23, Special #1 (1989–1991)

Malibu Comics
 Break-Thru #1–2 (1993–1994)
 Godwheel #3 (1995)
 Lord Pumpkin/Necromantra #1–4 (1995)
 Mantra #1–24, Giant-Size #1 (1993–1995)
 Mantra: Spear of Destiny #1–2 (1995)
 Sludge #4, 12 (1994)
 Ultraverse Zero: The Death of the Squad #1 (1995)
 Wrath #1–6, 8–9, Giant-Size #1 (1994)

Marvel Comics
 The Amazing Spider-Man #220 (1981)
 Captain America #241, 257 (1980–1981)
 Mandrake the Magician #1–2 (1995)
 Mantra vol. 2 #∞, 1, 3 (1995)
 Marvel Fanfare #6 (Spider-Man/Scarlet Witch); #46 (Fantastic Four); #49 (Two-Gun Kid) (1983–1990)
 Marvel Preview #23 (1980)
 Marvel Spotlight vol. 2 #8 (Captain Marvel) (1980)
 Marvel Team-Up #101–102, 105 (1981)
 Power Man and Iron Fist #76 (1981)
 Shroud #1–4 (1994)
 Solo Avengers #8 (Henry Pym) (1988)
 Spider-Man Unlimited #1 (1993)
 Star Trek #5–6, 17 (1980–1981)
 Star Wars #49 (1981)
 What If...? #26 (Captain America); #28 (Daredevil) (1981)

Television
Batman: The Animated Series (1993)
"Paging the Crime Doctor" (ep.53 story with Laren Bright,teleplay by Randy Rogel and Martin Pasko)

References

External links
 
 "DC Profiles #33: Mike W. Barr" at the Grand Comics Database
 Mike W. Barr at Mike's Amazing World of Comics
 Mike W. Barr at the Unofficial Handbook of Marvel Comics Creators

1952 births
20th-century American short story writers
21st-century American novelists
American comics writers
American male novelists
American male short story writers
American science fiction writers
Comic book editors
Inkpot Award winners
Living people
20th-century American male writers
21st-century American male writers